Trichomycterus chungaraensis is a species of pencil catfish endemic to Chile, where it is found in the streams around Lake Chungará.

References
 

chungaraensis
Fish of South America
Freshwater fish of Chile
Taxonomy articles created by Polbot
Fish described in 1983
Endemic fauna of Chile